The King–Byng affair was a Canadian constitutional crisis that occurred in 1926, when the governor general of Canada, the Lord Byng of Vimy, refused a request by the prime minister, William Lyon Mackenzie King, to dissolve parliament and call a general election.

The prime minister (leader of the Liberal Party) and the governor general agreed in October 1925 that, prior to a new election being called, the Conservative Party should be given the chance to form a government because it had the most seats, though not a majority. The Conservatives were not given this chance by 26 June 1926 when the prime minister asked the governor general to dissolve parliament anyway. This request was refused. The prime minister resigned and the governor general invited the Conservative Party to form a government. This government lost a motion of no confidence on 2 July 1926, and the governor general agreed to dissolve parliament immediately. Following the election on 14 September, King again assumed the office as prime minister, with a minority government.

The crisis came to redefine the role of governor general throughout the Dominions of the British Empire, becoming a major impetus in negotiations at Imperial Conferences held in the late 1920s that led to the adoption of the Statute of Westminster 1931. According to constitutional convention until then, the governor general represented the sovereign both in his imperial council and in his Canadian council, but the convention evolved afterwards into a tradition of non-interference in Canadian political affairs on the part of the British government. After 1931, the governor general remained an important figure in Canadian governance as a constitutional watchdog, but the role was shorn of its previous imperial duties.

Background

In September 1925, William Lyon Mackenzie King, the Prime Minister of Canada, advised the Governor General, the Lord Byng of Vimy, to dissolve parliament and drop the writ for a general election, to which Lord Byng agreed. In the subsequent election, held on 29 October, Arthur Meighen's Conservative Party won 116 seats in the House of Commons to 101 for King's Liberals. The Progressive Party, an agrarian centre-left party, won 22 seats.

Meighen declared victory, but King did not resign. The previous parliament, formed after the 1921 general election, had seen King frequently cooperate with members of the Progressive Party to maintain a majority. Although the Progressives' numbers had also been substantially reduced (from 58), they continued to hold the balance of power in the chamber, and King was confident this informal arrangement could continue even though the Liberals were no longer the largest party.

On 30 October, King visited Byng after consulting with the rest of Cabinet and informed the Governor General that his government would continue until parliament decided otherwise. Byng, who had suggested to King that he ought to resign with such a tenuous mandate, later stated he told the Prime Minister: "Well, in any event you must not at any time ask for a dissolution unless Mr Meighen is first given a chance to show whether or not he is able to govern", to which Byng believed King acquiesced, but King denied took place.

While Meighen and other Conservatives expressed public outrage at what they viewed as a desperate attempt on the part of King to cling to power, some Conservatives were privately relieved by King's decision; they seriously doubted whether the Tories could convince the Progressives to support a Conservative minority government, were confident that King's attempt to remain in power would eventually fail, and thought the expected debacle would be so damaging to the Liberals' reputation that the Conservatives would then be swept into office with a majority.

Customs scandal
A few months later, one of King's appointees in the Department of Customs and Excise was revealed to have taken bribes, after which the Conservatives alleged that the corruption extended to the highest levels of government, including the prime minister. King had already replaced the Minister of Customs and Excise, Jacques Bureau, with Georges Henri Boivin, but recommended that Byng appoint Bureau to the Senate. This alienated Progressive members who were already distancing themselves from the government because of its failure to transfer control of Alberta's natural resources from the federal government to the province.

The Progressive Party's support was temporarily retained by the formation of a special committee to investigate the corruption in the customs department. Its report, which was presented to the House of Commons, acknowledged that there was widespread fraud in the department but did not specifically criticise the government. A Conservative Member of Parliament, H. H. Stevens, proposed an amendment to the report which would effectively censure the government and compel it to resign. However, Labour MP J. S. Woodsworth proposed amending Stevens' amendment to remove the censure of the government and set up a Royal Commission to investigate the customs department further. The motion was defeated, despite the full support of the government. A Progressive MP, W. R. Fansher, then proposed that a Royal Commission be combined with the original motion of censure. The Speaker of the House ruled the motion out of order, but, on division, the members over-ruled the speaker and the Cabinet was defeated again. After a motion that the House adjourn, put forward by a Progressive member at King's behest, was subsequently also voted down, King announced that he would accept Fansher's amendment and secured an adjournment.

Request for dissolution
To avoid the inevitable vote on the Fansher amendment, which would either force his government's resignation or bring his administration into disrepute, King went to Byng on 26 June 1926 seeking a dissolution of parliament. Byng, citing his reserve powers, stated he was inclined to refuse the request, reminding King of their agreement made the previous October and arguing that the Conservatives, as the largest party in parliament, should have a chance to form a government before an election was called. For the next two days, the Prime Minister and the Governor General discussed the matter, with Byng asking King not to request a dissolution which he could not give and King twice requesting that Byng consult the British government prior to making any decision. Byng again refused, saying the matter should be settled in Canada, without resort to London. With Byng remaining steadfast, King formally presented the Governor General with an Order in Council for the dissolution of parliament on June 28, which Byng declined to sign, on the grounds that the House of Commons should first be given the opportunity to decide if it could support a different government.

Having been refused his formal request, King resigned. Byng then invited Conservative leader Arthur Meighen to form a government. Although many Conservatives privately preferred an election, Meighen believed he was bound by honour and convention to accept Byng's invitation and formed a Cabinet.

At that time, convention dictated that the ministers of the Crown drawn from the House of Commons were obliged upon appointment to resign their seats in parliament and run for re-election in by-elections. This posed a problem for Meighen: his and the other ministers' temporary absence from the House would make the government extremely vulnerable in the event of a vote of non-confidence. Meighen circumvented this by advising the appointment to Cabinet of ministers without portfolio, who were not required to run for re-election.  Progressives and Liberals saw the use of "acting ministers" as against the spirit of the convention, and moved for no-confidence in Meighen's government, which lost confidence by only one vote at 2 am on 2 July 1926.

Meighen subsequently requested a dissolution of parliament, which was granted by Byng on 2 July, and an election was called for 14 September. King's Liberals won a plurality of seats in the House of Commons, while Meighen lost his seat.

Legacy
Upon returning to power,  King's government sought at an imperial conference to redefine the role of the governor general as a personal representative of the sovereign in his Canadian council and not of the British government (the king in his British council). The change was agreed to at the Imperial Conference of 1926 and came to be official as a result of the Balfour Declaration of 1926 and Statute of Westminster 1931.

In a letter to King George V, whom he represented in Canada as governor general, Byng expressed surprise that Mackenzie King, a staunch nationalist, had requested that Byng consult the Colonial Office in London over the matter. Byng said: "I have to await the verdict of history to prove my having adopted a wrong course, and this I do with an easy conscience that, right or wrong, I have acted in the interests of Canada and implicated no one else in my decision." The Colonial Secretary, Leo Amery, privately informed Byng that had he appealed to the British government for an answer, "I could only have replied ... that in my view it would not be proper for the Secretary of State to issue instructions to the Governor with regard to the exercise of his constitutional duties."

Byng returned to the United Kingdom, leaving Canada on 30 September 1926 a much respected man in both countries, despite the political crisis. Some authorities have held that Byng was constitutionally obligated to refuse King's request; for example, Eugene Forsey argued that King's advice to Byng was "utterly unprecedented" and said further: "It was tantamount to allowing a prisoner to discharge the jury by which he was being tried ... If the Governor-General had granted the request, he would have become an accomplice in a flagrant act of contempt for Parliament." The relatively brief time that King had served in office prior to seeking a dissolution has also been cited as a reason for denying his request. In the United Kingdom in 1950, the Lascelles Principles expressed the relevant constitutional conventions in the matter, citing the King–Byng controversy as one of the underlying precedents.

Other authorities agreed with King, since, by custom, the Lord Byng of Vimy was obligated to heed the Prime Minister's request to call the election. In 1997, the governor-general of New Zealand, Sir Michael Hardie Boys, expressed the opinion that Byng had been in error in not re-appointing King as prime minister and then granting the dissolution of parliament to King instead of Meighen.

The King–Byng Affair was the most controversial use of a governor general's reserve powers until the Australian constitutional crisis of 1975, in which the Governor-General of Australia, Sir John Kerr, dismissed Prime Minister Gough Whitlam.

See also

 1975 Australian constitutional crisis
 Lascelles Principles
 Easter Crisis of 1920
 2008–09 Canadian parliamentary dispute

References

Further reading
 Esberey, J. E. "Personality and Politics: A New Look at the King-Byng Dispute," Canadian Journal of Political Science 1973 6(1): 37–55 in JSTOR
  Neatby, H. Blair. William Lyon Mackenzie King, 1924–1932: The Lonely Heights (1963)
 Thompson John H., and Allan Seager. Canada, 1922–1939: Decades of Discord. Toronto: McClelland and Stewart, 1985.

External links
 The King-Byng Affair – Canada’s Government in Minority; not a scholarly source but includes some documents
 The King-Byng Affair at Marianopolis College
 King-Byng Affair at The Canadian Encyclopedia
 CBC's Up the skirt or in the till: Top ten scandals in Canadian political history

Constitution of Canada
Monarchy in Canada
1926 in Canada
Political history of Canada
Political controversies in Canada
Canada in the World Wars and Interwar Years
1926 in international relations
William Lyon Mackenzie King
1926 in politics
Canada–United Kingdom relations
Constitutional crises